Armenia has participated in the New Wave International Contest 15 times, making its first appearance in 2003, where the Armenian singer Emmy finished fourteen.

Armenia has won the contest three times: in 2010, 2017 and 2021. The country's three wins were achieved by Sona Shahgeldyan (2010), Erna Mir (2017) and Saro Gevorgyan (2021). Armenia also finished in the top five several times during their participation in the contest, with Syuzanna Melqonyan and Gevorg Harutyunyan finishing second in 2017 and 2018, and Mger and Erik finishing fifth in 2008 and 2011 respectively.

Contestants

Awards

See also 
Armenia in the Eurovision Song Contest
Armenia in the Junior Eurovision Song Contest

References 

New Wave Festival